Monster Madness is a compilation album of heavy metal hits released in 2000 as part of Razor & Tie's "Monster" line of 1980s hard rock/metal compilation CDs (Monsters of Rock, Monster Ballads, etc.). However, despite including a number of Top Ten or Top 40 singles on the Billboard Hot 100, this was less successful than its predecessors, and it didn't receive a certification from the RIAA.

Track listing
"Dr. Feelgood" - Mötley Crüe - 4:51
"Unskinny Bop" - Poison - 3:48
"I Remember You" - Skid Row - 5:15
"Kiss Me Deadly" - Lita Ford - 4:01
"I Wanna Rock" - Twisted Sister - 3:04
"Silent Lucidity" - Queensrÿche - 5:49
"Epic" - Faith No More - 4:54
"Up All Night" - Slaughter - 3:47
"Don't Treat Me Bad" - FireHouse - 3:58
"Hole Hearted" - Extreme - 3:40
"Bang Your Head (Metal Health)" - Quiet Riot - 5:20
"In My Dreams" - Dokken - 4:21
"Wait" - White Lion - 4:03
"Easy Come, Easy Go" - Winger - 4:03
"I Saw Red" - Warrant - 3:50
"I'll See You in My Dreams" - Giant - 4:45

2000 compilation albums
Glam metal compilation albums
Hard rock compilation albums
Heavy metal compilation albums
Razor & Tie compilation albums